Datong Township is a mountain indigenous township in the southwestern part of Yilan County, Taiwan. It is the second largest township in Yilan County after Nan'ao Township.

Geography

It is predominantly populated by Taiwanese aborigines of the Atayal Tribe. The township is dominated by rugged mountains and wide river valleys. Most settlements in the county are located along the Lanyang River valley which runs from the central mountains of Taiwan into the Lanyang Plain.

 Area: 657.54 km2
 Population: 6,092 people (February 2023)

Administration
The villages of Datong include Daping, Fuxing, Hanxi, Leshui, Lunpi, Mao'an, Nanshan, Siji, Songluo and Yingshi. It was formerly the "Aboriginal Area" of Ratō District, Taihoku Prefecture during Japanese rule.

Economy
Economic activities include trucking silt from the Lanyang River for use in cement production and cultivation of tea, cabbage and betel nut palms.

Infrastructure
 Qingshui Geothermal Power Plant

Tourist attractions

 Atayal Life Museum
 Cingshuei's Geothermal Square (清水地熱廣場)
 Hatonozawa Hot Spring (鳩之澤溫泉)
 Jiuliao River Ecological Park
 Lanyang River
 Mingchi National Forest Recreation Area
 Mount Taiping
 Qilan Forest Recreation Area
 Songluo National Trail
 Taipingshan Scenic Recreation Area
 Yulan Tea Cultivation Area

References

External links

 

Townships in Yilan County, Taiwan